The 3 V Tourist Court in St. Francisville in West Feliciana Parish, Louisiana was built in 1938.  It listed on the National Register of Historic Places in 1993. It was originally listed with an address of 111 E. Commerce St., which is not found on current maps.

The complex has six small wood frame rental units reflecting Craftsman style, plus a manager's house and three non-contributing units.

References

Buildings and structures in West Feliciana Parish, Louisiana

Buildings and structures completed in 1938
National Register of Historic Places in Louisiana